Patrick Peter Sullivan (22 February 1885 – 15 February 1933) was an Australian-American cartoonist, pioneer animator, and film producer best known for producing the first Felix the Cat silent cartoons.

Early life
Sullivan was born in Paddington, New South Wales, the second son of Patrick Sullivan, an immigrant from Ireland and his Sydney-born wife Margaret, née Hayes. 
Around 1909, Sullivan left Australia and spent a few months in London, England, before moving to the United States around 1910. He worked as assistant to newspaper cartoonist William Marriner and drew four strips of his own. When Marriner died in 1914, Sullivan joined the new animated cartoon studio set up by Raoul Barré. In 1915, Sullivan was fired by Barre for general incompetence. In 1916, William Randolph Hearst, the newspaper magnate, set up a studio to produce animated cartoons based on his paper's strips and hired Barre's best animators. Sullivan decided to start his own studio and made a series called 'Sammy Johnsin' based on a Marriner strip on which he had worked. This was followed by a series of shorts starring The Tramp.

As Mickey Mouse was gaining popularity among theatre audiences through sound cartoons by late 1928, Sullivan, after years of refusing to convert Felix to sound, finally agreed to use sound in Felix's cartoons. Unfortunately, Sullivan did not carefully prepare this process and put sound in cartoons that the studio had already completed. By 1930, Felix had faded from the screen. Sullivan relented in 1933, and announced that Felix would return in sound, but died that year before production began.

By the early 1930s, Sullivan's alcoholism had completely consumed him. According to artist George Cannata, Sulivan would often fire employees in a drunken haze, not remembering the next day, when they would return to work as if nothing had happened. According to Shamus Culhane, Sullivan artist Al Eugster recalled that Sullivan was "[t]he most consistent man in the business—consistent in that he was never sober". According to Otto Messmer, Sullivan drank all day long and was never in a sound enough state of mind to contribute creatively to the cartoons he produced. In later years, much of Sullivan's staff was interviewed and claimed Messmer deserved all credit for the Felix character's creation and development, arguing that Sullivan was too sick to contribute or even really run the studio.

Death
Sullivan died on 15 February 1933 in New York City at age 47 from health problems brought on by alcoholism and pneumonia. (At the time, newspapers attributed his death to only pneumonia.) He is buried in Cathedral Cemetery in Scranton, Pennsylvania.

Character creations
[[File:Roscoe Arbuckle & Pat Sullivan - Mar 1921 EH.jpg|thumb|Roscoe Arbuckle holding Lasky Studio cat "Ethel" as model for Pat Sullivan to draw his Felix the Cat for the Paramount Magazine, on page 78 of the 12 March 1921 Exhibitors Herald.]]
Felix the Cat (disputed) 
Great Idea Jerry
Old Pop Perkins
Johnny Boston Beans
Obliging Oliver

Controversies
Rape conviction
In 1917, Sullivan was convicted of rape in the second degree of a 14-year-old girl. He spent 9 months and 3 days in prison, during which time his studio went on hiatus.

Racism
Sullivan reportedly carried a strong bias against African Americans. According to Rudy Zamora, when he and Eddie Salter tested for positions at the Sullivan studio, they were bested by a young African American boy. Zamora recalled that animator Dana Parker "took the black boy [aside] and told him that they’ll call him when they needed him, [as they were] not hiring anyone that day. But they kept Eddie and I. That was lousy. Then they would have hired this black guy and myself. Ed was third." When Zamora complained about this to Parker, he was told, "The old man (Sullivan) didn’t want any black guys."

Involvement in the creation of Felix the Cat
It is a matter of some dispute whether Felix was created by Sullivan or his top animator Otto Messmer. Some animation historians accepted Messmer's claim, as he was the principal animator on the Felix series.

 

However, Sullivan was drawing cartoons for Paramount Magazine by 1919 and later when he signed a contract as an animator with Paramount Studios in March 1920, one of the subjects specified in his curriculum vitae was a black cat named Felix who had first appeared in Paramount Magazine as a character named "Master Tom" in a cartoon series named Feline Follies, tending to support Sullivan's claim definitively.

Firsthand accounts were recorded in print, notably a recollection from 1953 by Australian writer Hugh McCrae, who was sharing an apartment with Pat Sullivan just before Felix was created. 'It comes properly as a postscript that in New York McCrae shared a flat with Pat Sullivan, the famed creator of "Felix, the Cat." When a film about Felix was being planned, Sullivan suggested that McCrae should do the drawings while he (Sullivan) supplied the ideas. McCrae refused and has regretted it ever since.'

Australian cartoonists find the Messmer claim not credible. Messmer came forward decades after Pat Sullivan's death, claimed Felix was his creation and placed the place of creation of the lucrative character in his own house, away from his boss's office. He excluded Pat Sullivan completely, and yet the lettering throughout the creation matches Pat Sullivan's hand. It is also telling that a cartoon kitten says "MUM" in Feline Follies'', with the Australian/British spelling, rather than "MOM", the American spelling; Messmer is less likely to have written that.

References

External links

 
 
 http://cartoonresearch.com/index.php/a-chat-with-rudy-zamora/
Pat Sullivan biography on Lambiek

1885 births
1933 deaths
Australian film producers
Australian cartoonists
Australian animators
Australian comics artists
Australian people convicted of rape
Australian people of Irish descent
Australian emigrants to the United States
Articles containing video clips